David Hoffman (December 24, 1784November 11, 1854) was an American legal scholar. He taught law at the University of Maryland from 1814 to 1843. Hoffman wrote Hoffman's Course of Legal Study, an influential early legal textbook.

Hoffman was born in Baltimore on December 24, 1784, the youngest of eight brothers, to Dorothea Stierlin Lloyd and Peter Hoffman. His father, a businessman, had emigrated from Germany to Maryland. He attended St. John's College, but left in 1802 without receiving a degree. In 1816, he married Mary McKean.

Hoffman left his professorship at the University of Maryland in 1836 to study in Europe. He received doctorates in law from the University of Maryland and the University of Oxford, and a doctorate of both laws from the University of Göttingen. He practiced law in Philadelphia from the late 1830s to 1847, when he left again for Europe.

He died in New York City on November 11, 1854.

Hoffman was influenced by the political philosopher James Harrington. He thought it was important for American lawyers to be familiar with Roman law and civil law.

Works 
 A Course of Legal Study (1817)
 
 
 
 Legal Hints (1846)
  (2 volumes, 1853–55)

References

Sources 
 

 

1784 births
1854 deaths
Alumni of the University of Oxford
American legal scholars
Lawyers from Baltimore
University of Göttingen alumni